The two ships of the Esso Atlantic class, Esso Atlantic and Esso Pacific, were two of only seven ships to surpass a half million tons deadweight in maritime history.

When plying the sea, the vessels had a fully laden draft of 25.3 m (83 ft), rendering them unable to navigate the English Channel, the Suez Canal or the Panama Canal when loaded to capacity.

Esso Atlantic (1977-1990)  234,626 tons to 247,160 tons, 508,628 DWT 
10/02/1977 : Esso Atlantic launched and built 
1/2/1983 : Transferred to Bahamian flag, owned by Esso International Shipping Co Ltd, Nassau, Bahamas 
16/08/1986 : Laid Up near Ålesund 
??/??/1990 : By Esso Eastern Marine Ltd., Bermuda, to Ceres Hellenic Shipping Ent. Ltd., Greece. Renamed Kapetan Giannis 
13/06/2002 : from Fujairah Anchorage bound for LOOP Oil Terminal. Sold to Pakistani breakers in 2002.

Esso Pacific (1977-1990)  234,626 tons to 247,161 tons, 508,628 DWT 
13/06/1977 : Esso Pacific launched and built 
??/??/1983 : Transferred to Bahamian flag, owned by Esso International Shipping Co Ltd, Nassau, Bahamas 
16/08/1986 : Laid Up near Ålesund 
??/??/1990 : By Esso Eastern Marine Ltd., Bermuda, to Ceres Hellenic Shipping Ent. Ltd., Greece. Renamed Kapetan Michalis 
2002: Broken up in Gadani Beach, Pakistan.

See also 
 Orders of magnitude (length)
 List of world's longest ships
 List of tankers

Notes

References

External links 
 Esso Atlantic
 Kapetan Giannis
 Esso Pacific
 Kapetan Michalis

Esso Atlantic class supertankers
Esso Atlantic class supertankers
Oil tankers
Ships built by Hitachi Zosen Corporation